The House of Skoropadsky is a noble Ukrainian family of Cossack origin.

Famous members 

Ivan Skoropadsky (1646 – September 3, 1722; reigned 1708–1722) – Hetman of Zaporizhian Host, succeeded the deposed Hetman Ivan Mazepa after his defection to the Swedes during the Great Northern War.
 Pavlo Skoropadsky (b. 1873-d.1945) – Lieutenant General in the Imperial Russian Army, member of Emperor Nicholas II's svita, briefly Hetman of Ukraine in 1918. Dethroned and expelled from the country by Symon Petliura. Claimant (1919–1945) to the post of Hetman. Died in exile in Nazi Germany in 1945.
 Danylo Skoropadsky (d. 1957) – Son of Pavlo, claimant to the Hetmanate (1945-1957). Died in London under mysterious circumstances, February 23, 1957.
 Maria Skoropadska (d. 1959) – daughter of Pavlo – (claimant 1957–1959)
 Yelyzaveta Skoropadska (d. 1976) – daughter of Pavlo – (claimant 1959–1976)
 Olena Skoropadska-Ott (b. 1919 - d. 2014) – daughter of Pavlo – (claimant 1976–2014)
 Borys Skoropadsky (b. 1956) - son of Danylo - (claimant 1999–present)

The Skoropadskys now reside in Toronto and the rights to Danylo's grave have been passed down to Olena Skoropadska-Ott's two daughters, after her death in 2014.

References

 V. I. Lenin "Everybody On Food And Transport Work!" Endnote: "In November–December 1918 the Ukrainian workers and peasants rose up against the German invaders and their stooge, Hetman Skeropadsky. On December 14 Skoropadsky fled from Kyiv."

Zaporizhian Cossacks noble families
Ukrainian monarchy